Octavius Ellis (born March 10, 1993) is an American professional basketball player for Treviso Basket of the Lega Basket Serie A (LBA). Standing at 2.08 m (6 ft 10 in), he plays the power forward and center positions.

High school career
Ellis played high school basketball at Whitehaven High School, in Memphis, Tennessee.

College career
Ellis began his collegiate career at the University of Cincinnati during the 2011–12 season. He was dismissed from the team that off season for an altercation at a nightclub. He then played two seasons at Trinity Valley Community College in Athens, Texas. There, he averaged 14.8 points, 9.7 rebounds and 3.2 blocked shots as a red-shirt sophomore during the 2013–14 season, while being named First Team All-America by the National Junior College Athletic Association. Ellis helped lead the Cardinals to their first NJCAA Tournament appearance since 1999, while posting a 29–7 record.

After two years at Trinity Valley, he returned to UC with two years of eligibility remaining. For that 2014–15 season, he started all 31 of the Bearcats' games, and led UC in scoring (with 10.0 points per game), in rebounding (with 7.3 per game), and in blocked shots (with 66 overall). He was named to the 2014–15 All-American Athletic Conference Second Team. The next season, he again helped lead the Bearcats to the 2016 NCAA Division I men's basketball tournament, where Cincinnati faced Saint Joseph's, and received a first-round elimination, in a controversial fashion, as Ellis' game-tying dunk was waved off for being 0.1 second too late.

Professional career
After failing to be drafted in the 2016 NBA draft, Ellis signed his first professional contract with the Montenegrin team Mornar Bar, of the Adriatic League. On March 9, 2017, he signed with the Alaska Aces, as their import for the 2017 PBA Commissioner's Cup. However, on March 18, three days before the team's first game, he left the Philippines to attend to an "important family matter".

On July 24, 2017, Ellis signed with Russian club Enisey. On December 29, 2017, Ellis left Enisey and joined Promitheas Patras, of the Greek Basket League. On June 21, 2018, Ellis renewed his contract for another year with Promitheas. On May 26, 2019, Ellis agreed to a new contract with the Greek club.

On January 27, 2020, Ellis officially signed with Greek club Olympiacos of the EuroLeague. He averaged 10.2 points and 6.9 rebounds per game.

On June 27, 2021, Ellis signed with Türk Telekom of the Turkish league.

On January 18, 2023, he signed with Treviso Basket of the Lega Basket Serie A (LBA).

Personal life
Ellis is the son of Jerrell Horne, a former basketball player at the University of Memphis. His cousin is former NBA player Monta Ellis.

References

External links 

 realgm.com profile
 eurobasket.com profile
 ABA League profile
 draftexpress.com profile
 Cincinnati Bearcats bio

1993 births
Living people
ABA League players
American expatriate basketball people in Greece
American expatriate basketball people in Montenegro
American expatriate basketball people in Russia
American men's basketball players
Basketball players from Memphis, Tennessee
BC Enisey players
Centers (basketball)
Cincinnati Bearcats men's basketball players
KK Mornar Bar players
Power forwards (basketball)
Promitheas Patras B.C. players
Olympiacos B.C. players
Trinity Valley Cardinals men's basketball players
Türk Telekom B.K. players
Universo Treviso Basket players